Kalu Singh Mahara was a Kumaoni(Kumauni) leader during the Indian Rebellion of 1857. He is known as a freedom fighter from the state of Uttarakhand, then in the United Province.

Kalu Singh began a campaign named as Krantiveer. It became was popular among freedom loving Kumaonis

Mahara is a surname found in Kumaon Division of Uttarakhand. Some people write their surname in its variant spelling in English as Mehra

Kalu Singh Mahara was  Thakur of  Bisung Patti of Kumaon(Kumaun), known as Karnakarayat now. This region is situated near Lohaghat, in district Champawat of Uttarakhand.

The rebellion
On receiving a confidential  letter from Oudh, Awadh, inviting him and followers to join a rebellion against the British Kalu Singh responded.

The government of Awadh proposed that after regaining  power from  British, the hill area would be given to locals whereas  Tarai (plain area) below the hills will be governed by Oudh. Kalu Singh Mahara agreed to this campaign against British empire

Skirmishes across the area of Kali , Sui, Gumdesh and adjoining areas,  frustrated the British. His militiamen composed mainly of riflemen Bandukchi ambushed and harassed the British forces on several occasions.

However in the end the British quashed the rebellion across northern India. But it led Queen Victoria to declare India as no longer a company territory transforming it into what is known as British India. (see Indian Rebellion of 1857)

Revered in Uttrakhand 

Kalu Singh Mahara is revered as a hero in Kumaon division of Uttarakhand. In 2009 a statue of this freedom fighter was installed in Dehradun the capital of Uttarakhand.

Recently the Uttarakhand postal department released a new first day cover to honour him (https://www.outlookindia.com/newsscroll/amp/uttarakhand-postal-dept-releases-special-envelope-on-kalu-mahara/2178058 )

References 

 The Himalayan Gazetter by E. T. Atkinson
 The History of Kumaun by B. D. Pandey

See also
 Indian Rebellion of 1857
 Kumaon(Kumaun)
 Kumaoni(Kumauni) People

Revolutionaries of the Indian Rebellion of 1857
People from Uttarakhand
History of Uttarakhand
Kumaon division